EVD may refer to:

 Ebola virus disease
 Eigenvalue decomposition
 Enhanced Versatile Disc
 English Version for the Deaf, a Bible translation
 External ventricular drain
 Extreme value distribution